Puerto Rico Highway 15 (PR-15) is a main highway connecting Cayey and Guayama. It takes longer though, than going south to Salinas through PR-52 and taking PR-53 to Guayama, due to it being a rural road.

Major intersections

See also

 List of highways numbered 15

References

External links
 

015